The voiced velar fricative is a type of consonantal sound that is used in various spoken languages. It is not found in Modern English but existed in Old English. It should not be confused with the graphically-similar , the IPA symbol for a close-mid back unrounded vowel, which some writings use for the voiced velar fricative.

The IPA also provides a dedicated symbol for a velar approximant, .

There is also a voiced post-velar fricative, also called pre-uvular, in some languages. For the voiced pre-velar fricative, also called post-palatal, see voiced palatal fricative.

Features

Features of the voiced velar fricative:

Occurrence
Some of the consonants listed as post-velar may actually be trill fricatives.

See also
 Index of phonetics articles
 Voiceless velar fricative
 Guttural

Notes

References

External links
 

Fricative consonants
Pulmonic consonants
Voiced oral consonants
Velar consonants
Central consonants